Mohammad Bolboli Rami (born 11 January 1998) is an Iranian footballer who plays as a left winger who currently plays for Iranian club Tractor in the Persian Gulf Pro League.

Club career

Sepidrood
He made his debut for Sepidrood in 17th fixtures of 2018–19 Iran Pro League against Sepahan S.C. while he substituted in for Mohammad Gholami.

References

1998 births
Living people
Iranian footballers
Association football midfielders
Sepidrood Rasht players
Esteghlal F.C. players
Naft Masjed Soleyman F.C. players